The 423rd Air Base Group (423 ABG) is a United States Air Force unit located at RAF Alconbury near the town of Huntingdon in the United Kingdom.  Its mission is to support operations at RAF Alconbury and the nearby base of RAF Molesworth.  Its primary customer is the Joint Analysis Center located at RAF Molesworth.

Units

 the 423rd Air Base Group is made up of the following units:
 421st Air Base Squadron (421 ABS) (RAF Menwith Hill, United Kingdom)
 423rd Civil Engineer Squadron (423 CES)
 423rd Communications Squadron (423 CS)
 423rd Force Support Squadron (423 FSS)
 423rd Medical Squadron (423 MDS)
 423rd Security Forces Squadron (423 SFS)
 426th Air Base Squadron (426 ABS) (Sola Air Station, Norway)

History 

The 423 ABG began life as the 423rd Air Base Squadron when it was activated on 12 July 1995 at RAF Molesworth.  The 423 ABS replaced the inactivated 710th Air Base Wing, briefly active at Alconbury to replace the 10th Air Base Wing, which had moved to Colorado on 1 November 1994. Exactly 10 years later, the 423rd ABS was reorganized as the 423rd Air Base Group.  This was part of a larger reorganization of many geographically separated units within the United Kingdom as components of the 501st Combat Support Wing also located at RAF Alconbury.  At this time, 423 ABG headquarters officially moved to RAF Alconbury.

In 2012, the group included around 400 personnel, including about 277 active duty military, 140 Department of Defense civilians and 170 Non-Appropriated Fund employees, as well as 255 Ministry of Defence employees.

Organization 
The group is organized into a group staff and six squadrons.  The squadrons include the 423rd Communications Squadron, 423rd Medical Squadron (initiated 2007), 423rd Security Forces Squadron, 423rd Force Support Squadron, and 423rd Civil Engineer Squadron.  The 426th Air Base Squadron is also under the 423rd Air Base Group but is geographically separated and physically located at Stavanger Air Base, Norway.

References

External links
- 426th Air Base Squadron site

Military units and formations established in 1995
0423